Sir John Stuart (1793 – 29 October 1876) was a British Conservative Party politician who sat in the House of Commons from 1846 to 1852, before becoming a judge.

Early life 
Stuart was the son of Dugald Stuart, of Ballachulish in Argyll. He was called to the bar at Lincoln's Inn in November 1819.

Career 
He was elected as a Member of Parliament (MP) for the borough of Newark-on-Trent at an unopposed by-election in January 1846. The borough was at that time under the patronage of the under the patronage of the Dukes of Newcastle-under-Lyne, and the 4th Duke was a staunch Conservative and protectionist. In an address "to the free and independent-minded electors of the borough of Newark", he pledged himself as a "firm supporter" of the Church of England and of the Corn Laws, claiming that their abolition would "injure the best interests of our empire". The hustings took place in the town square of Newark in heavy rain on the morning of 29 January 1846, where Stuart spoke in favour of protection for agriculture and for industry. Since no other candidate was proposed, Stuart was nominated and promptly declared elected. He was re-elected at the 1847 general election.

At the 1852 general election he did not stand again in Newark. The 5th Duke (who had succeeded in 1851) was a supporter of free trade, and declined to support Stuart. Stuart was elected instead for the borough of Bury St Edmunds. He resigned that seat later the same year to take up the post of Vice Chancellor (i.e. a judge of the Court of Chancery). He succeeded James Parker, who had died, after some speculation. Earlier that year Stuart had refused the post of Solicitor General in Lord Derby's new government, and was reported to be indignant that he was not appointed Lord Chancellor. Whilst he was reported by The Times to be eminently qualified for the role, it was suggested that his Ultra-Toryism and opposition to reform of Chancery would make his appointment unpopular.

He was knighted in 1853, and sat as a judge until 1871, when he retired on a pension and was sworn as member of the Privy Council.

Family 
In 1813, Stuart married Jessie, the daughter of Duncan Stewart.

He was a landlord in Scotland, with estates at Loch Carron in Ross-shire and Grishernish on the Isle of Skye. He was reported by The Times newspaper to be a "deservedly popular" landlord.

Arms
 "I aspire to greater things"

References

External links 

1793 births
1876 deaths
Conservative Party (UK) MPs for English constituencies
UK MPs 1841–1847
UK MPs 1847–1852
UK MPs 1852–1857
Chancery Division judges
Knights Bachelor
Members of the Privy Council of the United Kingdom
Members of Lincoln's Inn
People from Lochaber
Members of the Judicial Committee of the Privy Council